Global Underground 024: Nick Warren, Reykjavik is DJ mix album in the Global Underground series released by Boxed in 2003.  It is mixed by Nick Warren and based on his performances in Reykjavík.  The first CD is characterized by "ambient and experimental sounds", "trip hop style beats", and "atmospheric reggae grooves", as described by Progressive-Sounds.com.  The second CD is much closer to the usual progressive house tracks put forth on the Global Underground series.  The album reached #25 on the Billboard Top Electronic Albums chart.

GU’s favourite son comes back to wax for journey number 5, and his sound becomes noticeably more experimental. The remote but intense setting provided by Iceland’s famously wild capital acts as the springboard for a pertinently quirky collection. Word at the time was that Nick was about to quit DJing to focus on his Way Out West productions, so many felt that this was a daring and ultimately hugely successful exploration of the further reaches of creative freedom that GU had always offered him.

As has since often proved the case with DJ ‘retirements’, the lure of the turntables proves too great, and Warren has now returned to the decks and continues to turn in the ongoing instalments of his very personal association with Global.

Track listing

Disc one
Avatar - Dub In Time  – 6:19
Substructure - Firewire  – 3:28
Atlas - Compass Error (Tarrentella:Redanka Dubbed Version)  – 5:34
Ulrich Schnauss - Nobody's Home/Shuffle Heads - Roll Call (Asad Rizvi's Silverlining Mix)  – 6:40
Boards of Canada - Happy Cycling  – 2:07
Yunx - Thinking About Your Next Move  – 4:40
Planet Funk - Tightrope Artist Tale  – 6:09
Momu - The Dive/Mastermind - In Every Truth  – 6:03
Justin Simmons - Helga Möller (New Aluminists Remix)  – 3:16
Burufunk - Outsider/Global Communication - 14:31/MOT - 110 Mistakes   – 6:25
Grayarea - Yewminyst  – 8:41
Glimmer of Dope - Love Lost  – 6:20

Disc two
Tocharian - Awakening/Juan Recoba - Head Start   – 8:22
Aural Imbalance - Aural Navigation (Part Two)  – 12:46
Vector 13 - Rise  – 7:23
Aquaculture - Don't Play The Game  – 8:07
Dream Traveler - Headpusher  – 7:22
Rambient - Karma (Jimmy Van M/Steve Porter Team Ram Rod Mix)  – 8:36
Starkid - Crayons  – 7:22
Subsky - Strawberry Fields  – 8:06
Kris B - Last Minute Flight  – 7:47

References

External links 

Global Underground
2003 compilation albums